Waterblommetjiebredie is a stew.  The name comes from the Afrikaans language and literally means 'little water flowers stew'. It is made of meat, typically lamb, stewed together with the waterblommetjies (Aponogeton distachyos flowers) which are found in the dams and marshes of the Western Cape of South Africa. The buds of Aponogeton distachyos are usually ready to be picked in the southern midwinter months of July and August, leading to their use in winter stews such as waterblommetjiebredie.

The taste of the stew has been described as much like stewed green beans. Waterblommetjiebredie is a local delicacy in South Africa.

History
Waterblommerjiebredie was first prepared by the Khoikhoi people indigenous to South Africa. They taught the early settlers of South Africa how to use waterblommetjie as food and medicine.

Recipes
The typical main ingredients of waterblommetjiebredie:
 lamb or mutton
 waterblommetjies
 Cape sorrel ( in Afrikaans)
 onions
 potatoes
 salt and pepper

See also

 List of African dishes
 List of stews

Notes

South African stews
Lamb dishes